Yemi Kale was the Statistician General of the National Bureau of Statistics of Nigeria from 2011 to 2021.

Under his tenure, the GDP of Nigeria was recalculated, and following the recalculation, declared the largest GDP in Africa.

Kale assumed office in 2011, and was reappointed in 2016 making him the first chief executive in the agency's history to serve two terms as statistician general. Kale is also a member of the boards of Skye Bank and SFS Capital Nigeria Limited. Before assuming office Kale acted as a special adviser to the Nigerian Minister of Finance and Minister of National Planning as well as group head of research and strategy at Investment Banking and Trust Company, now Stanbic IBTC Bank. In addition, Kale is a member of the World Economics Association, UK Royal Economic Society, and a fellow of the UK Royal Statistical Society. He is also a fellow of the Nigerian Statistical Association and a fellow of the Institute of Chartered Administrators and Researchers of Nigeria among others. At The National Bureau of the Statistics he has been applauded by both Nigerian and foreign observers from his reforms in the data process which many believe has restored sanity to the data production process in Nigeria. Kale is commended for introducing methodology updates, some decades old, using modern technology such as Computer Assisted Personal Interview Devices to gather data and improving platforms for data dissemination including a data portal, upgraded website and app and the use of infographics to make data easily understandable by users. Under him timeliness of data, data quantity and quality has been greatly enhanced and data credibility improved significantly. He is highly regarded for his fierce refusal to tamper with data or rejection of the politicization of data which has gained him recognition from both pro and anti governments stakeholders as well as the international community. In August 2016 he declared that Nigeria's economy had entered into a recession, the first time in 25 years. Kale was awarded the National Productivity Order of Merit for outstanding performance, professionalism and diligence in February 2017 by the Nigerian President Muhammad Buhari.

Life
Yemi Kale graduated with a BSc (first-class honours) in economics from Addis Ababa University. Additionally, he holds an MSc (with distinction) as well as a PhD in economics from the London School of Economics and Political Science (LSE). Kale has worked as an equity analyst and a quantitative research analyst where he was later left to become head of research and investment strategy at what is now Stanbic IBTC Bank, where he is credited with being largely responsible for the development of investment research in Nigeria while being head of research at what is now Stanbic IBTC.

Kale was awarded the African Financial Analyst of the Year award by the African Investor magazine in 2009. Kale was also awarded the National Productivity Order of Merit by the Nigerian President in February 2017. He has served on several presidential committees and advisory bodies and is an alumnus of the Harvard Kennedy School of Government leadership in government programs.

References

Nigerian civil servants
Fellows of the Royal Economic Society
Living people
Year of birth missing (living people)